Parliamentary elections were held in the Georgian SSR on 28 October 1990, with a second round on 11 November. They were the first free parliamentary election in since 1919, and saw Round Table-Free Georgia emerge as the largest party in Parliament, with 155 of the 250 seats. Voter turnout was 69.9%.

Round Table-Free Georgia MP Zviad Gamsakhurdia was elected by the Congress as Chairman of the Presidium of the Supreme Council on 14 November, effectively the leader of Georgia.

The elected parliament was responsible for some of the most important decisions in the modern Georgian history, such as the declaration of independence from the Soviet Union, the adoption of the first Constitution of the Republic of Georgia, as well as the revocation of South Ossetian autonomy and the subsequent prosecution of the war in South Ossetia.

It was the first and only free election to the Supreme Council of Georgian SSR. The Council ceased functioning after the coup d'état of 6 January 1992 and some of its members took part in the subsequent civil war. The Parliament of Georgia was re-instituted in March 1992 as the "State Council" and the fresh elections were held on 4 August of the same year.

Results

References

1990 in Georgia (country)
Parliamentary elections in Georgia (country)
Georgia
October 1990 events in Europe
November 1990 events in Europe
Election and referendum articles with incomplete results